National Weather Service St. Louis is the National Weather Service office located in St. Charles, Missouri, just outside St. Louis, Missouri.  There are 46 counties in its County Warning Area (CWA).  Some of the cities in its CWA are Columbia, Farmington, Hannibal and Jefferson City in Missouri, and Belleville, Centralia, Edwardsville, and Quincy in Illinois.

NOAA Weather Radio stations

The St. Louis office operates 11 stations in western Illinois and eastern Missouri.

KDO-84

KDO84 (sometimes referred to as St. Louis All Hazards) is a NOAA Weather Radio station that serves Greater St. Louis and surrounding cities. It is programmed from the National Weather Service forecast office in St. Louis, Missouri with its transmitter located in Shrewsbury. It broadcasts weather and hazard information for Franklin, Jefferson, Lincoln, St. Charles, St. Louis, and Warren counties in Missouri as well as Madison, Monroe, and St. Clair counties in Illinois. Listen online @ https://www.broadcastify.com/listen/feed/27479

WWF-75

WWF-75 is located just northeast of Bourbon, Missouri operating at 162.525 MHz. The station serves Cuba, Sullivan, and Union and provides weather and hazard information for Gasconade, Franklin, Crawford, Washington, Iron, and Phelps counties in Missouri. Programming for Phelps County is provided by the National Weather Service office in Springfield, Missouri.

WXK-82

WXK-82 is located adjacent to Palmyra Rd. in northwest Hannibal, Missouri, operating at 162.475 MHz. The station provides weather and hazard information for Lewis, Shelby, Marion, Monroe, Ralls, and Pike counties in Missouri, as well as Adams, Brown, and Pike counties in Illinois.

WXL-45

WXL-45 is located adjacent to County Rd. 202 just northwest of Fulton in Callaway County, Missouri, operating at 162.400 MHz. The station provides weather and hazard information for Audrain, Boone, Callaway, Cole, Osage, and Gasconade counties in Missouri.  Licensed to Columbia but identifying on-air as "WXL45 Fulton," it provides local forecasts for Columbia, Jefferson City and Mexico. Columbia and Jefferson City are also served by KWN55 in Jamestown, a newer transmitter that provides a stronger signal than WXL45 to much of Boone County and Cole County.

WWG-49

WWG-49 is located near Cedar Mountain southwest of Fredericktown on Route C in Madison County, Missouri, operating at 162.500 MHz.  The station provides weather and hazard information for St. Francois, Ste. Genevieve, Iron, Reynolds, Madison, Wayne, and Bollinger counties in Missouri.  Programming for Wayne and Bollinger counties are provided by the National Weather Service office located in Paducah, Kentucky.

KXI-49
KXI-49 is located southeast of Salem, IL. It operates at 162.475 MHz and serves Salem, Mt. Vernon, and Centralia in south-central Illinois.

KXI-70

KXI70 (sometimes referred to as Jerseyville All Hazards) is a NOAA Weather Radio station that serves Jerseyville, Illinois and surrounding cities as well as the northern and eastern portions of the Greater St. Louis area. It is programmed from the National Weather Service forecast office in St. Louis, Missouri with its transmitter located southeast of Jerseyville. It broadcasts weather and hazard information for the following counties in Illinois: Calhoun, Greene, Jersey, Macoupin, and Madison.

KXI-42
Located northwest of Chester, IL and operating at 162.450 MHz, KXI-42 serves Chester, Illinois and Perryville, Missouri.

KXI-79
Located just east of Coffeen Lake near Hillsboro, IL and operating at 162.425 MHz, KXI-79 serves Litchfield and Vandalia in south-central Illinois.

KWN-55
Located west of Jamestown in Moniteau County and operating at 162.425 MHz, KWN-55 serves Columbia, Jefferson City, and California in central Missouri. Together with WXL45, the station serves the Columbia and Jefferson City areas.

WNG-728
Located east of Bellflower in Montgomery County, WNG-728 operates at 162.425 MHz and serves a large area of northeastern Missouri including Bowling Green, Warrenton, Troy, Hermann, and fringe coverage extending from Mexico to the northwestern St. Louis suburbs. this station is off the air

External links
 NWS St. Louis NOAA Weather Radio Info
 NOAA Weather Radio Coverage Maps

Organizations based in St. Louis
St. Louis
Mass media in St. Louis